The 2004–05 Croatian First Football League (officially known as the Prva HNL Ožujsko for sponsorship reasons) was the fourteenth season of the Croatian First Football League, the national championship for men's association football teams in Croatia, since its establishment in 1992. The season started on 23 July 2004 and ended on 28 May 2005. Hajduk Split were the defending champions, having won their seventeenth championship title the previous season, and they defended the title again, after a win against Varteks on 28 May 2005.

Teams

Stadia and personnel

 1 On final match day of the season, played on 28 May 2005.

First stage

Rounds 1–22 results

Championship group

Rounds 23–32 results

Relegation group

Rounds 23–32 results

Relegation play-off

First leg

Second leg

Međimurje win 3–1 on aggregate.

Top goalscorers

Source: 1.hnl.net

See also
2004–05 Croatian Second Football League
2004–05 Croatian Football Cup

External links
Season statistics at HRNogomet
2004–05 in Croatian Football at Rec.Sport.Soccer Statistics Foundation

Croatian Football League seasons
Cro
Prva Hnl, 2004-05